Senator Savage may refer to:

Christine Savage (born 1931), Maine State Senate
John Houston Savage (1815–1904), Tennessee State Senate